Fleatown is an unincorporated community in Licking County, Ohio, United States.

According to Frank K. Gallant, Fleatown may have been so named on account of its unsophisticated character.

References

Unincorporated communities in Licking County, Ohio
Unincorporated communities in Ohio